Centrotus cornutus (thorn-hopper) is a species of "treehoppers" belonging to the family Membracidae.

Distribution
This species is present in most of Europe, in the eastern Palearctic realm and in the Near East. It is one of only two UK treehoppers.

Habitat
These thorn-hoppers inhabit woodlands, beech forests, hedge rows and moderately moist or dry areas.

Description
The adults reach  of length, while females are slightly larger. The basic colouration of the stocky body is dark-brown. The large protruding eyes are round and reddish-brown to red. The pronotum is hairy, arched up and pulled back in a long, wave-shaped extension above the wings, with two sharp, ear-shaped lateral protrusions (hence the Latin name cornutus, meaning "horned"). The legs are very short. The front wings are pale brown and translucent, with evident brown veins.

The bizarre horn-like extensions of the pronotum apparently help the camouflage. As a matter of fact, when this insect is at rest on a branch with the legs retracted, it looks like a part of the branch itself.

This species is rather similar to Gargara genistae, the second UK species of treehoppers, that lacks the horn-like protrusions, has a shorter extension above the wings and it is associated with broom.

Biology
They can be encountered from early May through early August. Both males and females produce vibrational signals during courtship and they are able to jump as orthoptera. After mating at the end of June and early July the females lay several eggs in the stalk of herbaceous plants, on which hatching larvae feed.  These "treehoppers" are polyphagous, feeding on plant juices, which they take with their specially built, piercing-sucking mouth parts. The larvae mainly live on Cirsium, Carduus and Urtica species, while the adult insects prefer Populus, Quercus and Rubus species. They overwinter in the litter layer in the larval stage and have a two-year life cycle.

Gallery

Bibliography
 Arzone A., 1971. "Illustration of the biological cycle of Centrotus cornutus L. in Piedmont" (Hem. Hom. Membracidae). Annali della Facolta di Scienze Agrarie della Universita degli Studi di Torin 6: 283-322
 Linnaeus, C., 1758: "Systema naturae per regna tria naturae, secundum classes, ordines, genera, species, cum characteribus, differentiis, synonymis, locis. Editio Decima, Reformata. Tomus I". Laurentii Salvii, Stockholm. 824 pp. page 435
 Mueller, 1984: "On the voltinism (generation sequence) of the treehopper Centrotus cornutus (L.) (Homoptera Auchenorrhyncha: Membracidae) and on the anidation of pluriannual insects." Zool. Jahrb. (anat. Ontog. Tiere) 111: 321-337
 Nast, J., 1987: "The Auchenorrhyncha (Homoptera) of Europe" -  Annales Zoologici Warszawa 40: 535-661
 Nickel, H., 2003: "The Leafhoppers and Planthoppers of Germany (Hemiptera, Auchenorrhyncha): patterns and strategies in a highly diverse group of phytophagous insects" - Pensoft Series Faunistica No. 28, Sofia-Moscow, Keltern, 1-460
 Nickel, Herbert & Remane, Reinhard, 2002: " Check list of the planthoppers and leafhoppers of Germany, with notes on food plants, diet width, life cycles, geographic range and conservation status (Hemiptera, Fulgoromorpha and Cicadomorpha)". Beiträge zur Zikadenkunde No.5, pp.27-64.
Świerczewski, D., & Stroiński, A., 2011: "The first records of the Nearctic treehopper Sictocephala bisonia in Poland (Hemiptera: Cicadomorpha: Membracidae) with some comments on this potential post". Polish Journal of Entomology/Polskie Pismo Entomologiczne 80: 13-22

References

External links
 Biolib

Membracidae
Insects described in 1758
Hemiptera of Europe
Taxa named by Carl Linnaeus